Dattatreya Rama Rao Parvatikar [1916-1990],  was a Hindu saint and sanyasi in India.

Spiritual life
Dattatreya Parvatikar lived in the premises of Badrinath Temple of The Himalayas. He was fondly called veena baaba by his spiritual followers.

Music

Parvatikar, an exponent of nada yoga, tried to spread spirituality through music.

He was keenly interested in Indian classical music and played the rudra veena. Alain Daniélou made recordings of his performances between 1950 and 1955. They are now part of a UNESCO project - UNESCO Collection of Traditional Music of the World. As a tribute to Alain Daniélou, UNESCO re-issued the album on 1997 as Anthology of Indian Classical Music – A Tribute to Alain Daniélou.

He started the Nada Yoga School in Rishikesh in 1950.

Raghavendra mission
In 1975, Dattatreya Parvatikar founded the Shri Raghavendra Mission in Bangalore. In his memory, a music concert is held every year at Gayan Samaj Bangalore.

References

External links
veenababa's music
Shri Raghavendra Mission
Nada Yoga School

Rudra veena players
Sitar players
Hindustani instrumentalists
String musicians
Vichitra veena players
1916 births
1990 deaths
20th-century Indian musicians